The 1965 UC Riverside Highlanders football team represented the University of California, Riverside as an independent during the 1965 NCAA College Division football season. Led by first-year head coach Pete Kettela, UC Riverside compiled a record of 6–2. The team was outscored by its opponents 189 to 183 for the season. The Highlanders played home games at Highlander Stadium in Riverside, California.

Schedule

References

UC Riverside
UC Riverside Highlanders football seasons
UC Riverside Highlanders football